Thirteen Stories High is a 2008 album by California-based folk singer-songwriter Joel Rafael.  The album's political tone is set by the first track, "This Is My Country", which features David Crosby and Graham Nash on background vocals.  Political themes continue throughout the album both in Rafael's own songs and in two covers: Steve Earle's "Rich Man's War" and Jack Hardy's "I Oughta Know".

This is the first album in which Rafael is billed as a solo artist and here he records with a few talented session players rather than with the members of his Joel Rafael band.  Rafael does spend a bit of time covering old territory, re-recording his own songs, "Time Stands Still" and "Reluctant Angel".  Rafael has announced plans to tour in support of the new record.

Track listing 
 "This Is My Country" (Rafael) – 4:55  
 "Ball & Chain" (Rafael) – 3:01  
 "Rich Man's War" (Earle) – 3:09  
 "I Ought to Know" (Hardy) – 3:45  
 "Missing Pages" (Rafael) – 4:33  
 "Dancing to the Dream" (Rafael) – 3:45  
 "Open Up Your Heart" (Rafael) – 3:11  
 "Wild Honey" (McClemore, Rafael) – 3:03  
 "Time Stands Still" (Rafael) – 3:19  
 "Song of Socrates" (Rafael) – 3:34  
 "Reluctant Angel" (Rafael) – 2:45  
 "Promised Land" (Rafael) – 4:27  
 "Rivers and Rain" (Rafael) – 3:31

Credits

Musician
 Joel Rafael – acoustic guitar, vocals
  John Inmon – Electric guitar
 Radoslav Lorković – Organ, Piano  
 Glenn Schuetz – bass  
 Wally Doggett – drums
 David Crosby – vocals
 Graham Nash – vocals & harmonica
 Jamaica Rafael – vocals

Production
 Produced by Joel Rafael
 Engineered Jared Brown, John Inmon, Joel Rafael, and Fred Remmert
 Mixed by Joel Rafael
 Mastered by Gavin Lurssen
 Executive producer/Management – Cree Clover Miller

Artwork
 Brian Porizek – Art direction, design
 Pete Lacker – Photography

Charts

Releases

External links 
"This Is My Country" video & mp3 from joelrafael.com

References 

2008 albums
Joel Rafael albums